Alex Aadroa Onzima is a Ugandan politician. He was the State Minister in the Office of the Vice President in the Ugandan cabinet. He was appointed to that position on 6 June 2016.
Prior to that from 27 May 2011 until 6 June 2016, he served as the State Minister for Local Government. He replaced Perez Ahabwe. Onzima also served as the elected member of parliament, representing Maracha County, Maracha District in the 9th Parliament (2011 to 2016).

Background and education
Onzima was born in Maracha District, West Nile sub-region, Northern Region on 26 June 1952. He attended local schools before he entered Makerere University, where he studied public health dentistry from 2002 until graduating in 2005 with a Bachelor of Science.

Work history
Onzima has represented Maracha County in Uganda's parliament since 1996. From 1996 until 2004, he was part of the no-party system in the country. In 2004, when the Forum for Democratic Change (FDC) was created, he joined it. In 2010, he formally left FDC and joined the ruling National Resistance Movement. However, in the 2011 parliamentary elections, there were media reports that he intended to run as an independent candidate. In the cabinet created after the 2011 national elections, Onzima was appointed Minister of State for Local Government. In the cabinet list released on 6 June 2016, he was named State Minister in the Office of the Vice President.

See also
Cabinet of Uganda
Parliament of Uganda
West Nile sub-region
List of political parties in Uganda

References

External links
 Full of List of Ugandan Cabinet Ministers May 2011

Living people
1952 births
Members of the Parliament of Uganda
National Resistance Movement politicians
People from West Nile sub-region
People from Maracha District
Government ministers of Uganda
Makerere University alumni
People educated at St. Joseph's College Ombaci
21st-century Ugandan politicians